Auguste Chapuis (25 April 1858 – 6 December 1933) was a 19th/20th century French composer, organist, and professor. He
was a student with César Franck. The  in the 20th arrondissement of Paris was named after him when he died in 1933.

He was awarded the Prix Rossini in 1886 for Les Jardins d'Armide on a libretto by the playwright Émile Moreau.

In 1894, he succeeded Adolphe Danhauser as head of the municipal  of Paris.

Works (selection) 
 Ronde, score for 2 female voices or children song. Durand & Cie
 Tambourin, score for 2 female voices or children song. Durand & Cie
 Le Chêne abattu, choir for three equal voices. Score for chant. Durand & Cie
 Les Demoiselles de St. Cyr, musical comedy in four acts based on the play by Alexandre Dumas. Score chant and piano.
 Poèmes d'amour, lyrics by de R. Darzens 1895
 Enguerrande, lyrical drama in 4 acts and 5 tableaux, libretto by Victor Wilder after the poem by Émile Bergerat, created at the Opéra-Comique on 9 may 1892. Choudens 1892 
 Fantaisie concertante for double bass and piano. Durand 1907
 Three pieces for piano: L'Aurore sur le lac ; Dans la montagne ; Rondes enfantines. Durand 1931

References 

French composers
French ballet composers
French opera composers
Male opera composers
French classical organists
French male organists
Conservatoire de Paris alumni
People from Haute-Saône
1858 births
1933 deaths
Male classical organists